St. Pölten Hauptbahnhof is the main railway station at St. Pölten, which is the capital city of the federal state of Lower Austria, located in the north east of Austria. The station is one of the western endpoints of the Verkehrsverbund Ost-Region (East Region Transportation Authority).

Train services
With only a few exceptions, all long-haul and regional trains run through St. Pölten railway station. Because of its location both on the existing Western Railway (Austria) and on its new high-speed line, the station is a stop on the Main line for Europe from Paris to Bratislava/Budapest.

The station is also the terminal for three regional transportation networks:
 The non-electrified Leobersdorfer Bahn, serving six stations in the Sankt Pölten urban area and several at smaller towns further south.
 The electrified Tullnerfelder Bahn, serving stops within the city and to the north as far as Tulln an der Donau. A two-track expansion between Sankt Pölten and Herzogenburg is planned.
 The electrified narrow-gauge Mariazell Railway which runs south to the Catholic pilgrimage town Mariazell.
The station is served by the following services:

Intercity-Express services (ICE 91) Hamburg - Hanover - Kassel - Nürnberg - Passau - Linz - St. Pölten - Vienna - Vienna Airport
Intercity-Express services (ICE 91) Dortmund - Essen - Düsseldorf - Cologne - Koblenz - Frankfurt - Nürnberg - Passau - Linz - St. Pölten - Vienna - Vienna Airport
RailJet services Zürich - Innsbruck - Salzburg - Linz - St. Pölten - Vienna - Győr - Budapest
RailJet services Munich - Salzburg - Linz - St. Pölten - Vienna - Győr - Budapest

History
Construction of the station began on 9 September 1856, five years after the "Empress Elisabeth West Railway" was launched. The construction of the station meant a considerable change to the urban character of the town. First, the Kremsertor (gate in the medieval wall) had to be dismantled, followed by the destruction of the entire city wall. A promenade was built in its place. Two years later, the first trains began to use the new stop. In 1877, the railway line between Leobersdorf, Kaumberg and Sankt Pölten became operational. Eight years later, lines to Krems an der Donau and Tulln an der Donau were added. With these new lines, the station building had become too small, so in 1877 a two-year construction project began to erect the current building. In 1907 the station became the terminal of the electric Mariazell Railway. In 1911 it was connected to the city's tram network, which operated until 1976. The station was rebuilt several times over the years, particularly after the city was bombed in April 1945. From 1965 to 1969, the western part of the station was renovated and the decorative corner pavilions made functional.

Between 2006 and 2010, the station underwent a €190-million renovation, resulting in a new pedestrian walkway and new platforms. A road tunnel was built on the western side of the complex and the forecourt was redesigned by the city of Sankt Pölten. The station building was also completely renovated; work that included a replacing the roof and façade and adding a better-lit central hall, an information kiosk and new shops. The renovated station was reopened on September 10, 2010.

References

External links 

Railway stations in Lower Austria
Railway stations opened in 1858
Sankt Pölten
Buildings and structures in Sankt Pölten